magnussoft Deutschland GmbH is a German computer game developer and publisher. The company is seated in Kesselsdorf, close to the Saxon capital of Dresden.

In Europe magnussoft are well known, primarily for their releases of collections of software for 8-Bit computer systems that were very popular in the 1980s: Commodore 64, Commodore Amiga, Atari XL/XE, and Atari ST. All required emulators are included so the software work on ordinary PCs although the programs are unaltered. There is a general collection called Retro-Classix that covers a bit of everything and collections that specialize on one particular system, like the Amiga Classix or the C64 Classix. Several successors followed.

The company released more than 160 products over the past ten years. Among their assortment are adventure games, board games, strategic games as well as shoot’em up games and jump and runs. On the other hand, magnussoft also released computer applications and educational software. The software was brought under varied labels to the market in Germany, Austria, Switzerland, the Benelux countries, France, Great Britain, and the United States of America.

By 2008 magnussoft have gained access to the software market, especially in the lower budget and middle price range. They cooperate with acquainted German partners like for example "ak tronik Software & Services", "KOCH Media", and the "Verlagsgruppe Weltbild". In addition magnussoft has founded more subsidiaries in other parts of Europe. However, magnussoft does not publish outside of Europe, they leave that work to local companies.

magnussoft have created their profile through the release of ZETA, a broad range of retro games, and classic computer games like Aquanoid, Barkanoid or Plot's.

Games (selection) 

 Amiga Classix
 Aquanoid
 Barkanoid
 Boulder Match 
 Break It
 C64 Classix
 Colossus Chess 
 Dr. Tool Serie
 Fix & Foxi Serie
 Jacks Crazy Cong
 Jump Jack
 KLIX
 METRIS
 MiniGolf
 Packs Serie
 PLOTS!
 Pool Island
 Retro-Classix
 Sokoman
 BURN

Applications (selection) 

 Dr Brain series 
 Dr. Tool series 
 Driver Cataloger
 Easy Bootmanager
 Typing Tutor

Educational software (selection) 

 Deutsch, Englisch und Mathe für Zwerge
 Deutsch– und Mathe Compilation
 Fahrschule

Criticism 
In 2006 magnussoft incurred public criticism for ceasing the distribution and the funding of BeOS replacement Magnussoft Zeta OS because of its uncertain legal status.

Trademarks 
 Amiga Classix
 Aquanoid
 Barkanoid
 C64 Classix
 Dr. Brain
 Dr. Tool
 Retro Classix

References

External links 
 magnussoft - official website

Video game publishers
Video game companies of Germany
Companies based in Saxony
BeOS
Wilsdruff